Pterostylis tenuis commonly known as the smooth leafy greenhood is a plant in the orchid family Orchidaceae and is endemic to New South Wales. Non-flowering plants have a rosette of leaves on a short stalk. Flowering plants lack a rosette but have up to four shiny, translucent green flowers on a flowering stem with three to six stem leaves.

Description
Pterostylis tenuis, is a terrestrial,  perennial, deciduous, herb with an underground tuber. The dorsal sepal and petals are joined to form a hood over the column with the dorsal sepal having a brown or green tip. Flowering occurs in September and October.

Taxonomy and naming
The smooth leafy greenhood was first formally described in 2006 by David Jones who gave it the name Bunochilus tenuis and published the description in Australian Orchid Research from a specimen collected in the Cadia Valley. In 2010, Gary Backhouse changed the name to Pterostylis tenuis. The specific epithet (tenuis) is a Latin word meaning "thin", referring to the narrow labellum of this species.

Distribution and habitat
Pterostylis tenuis grows on slopes and ridges in dry forest between the Torrington and Bathurst areas and is more common in the southerly parts of its range.

References

tenuis
Orchids of New South Wales
Plants described in 2006